This page shows the results of the Synchronized Swimming Competition at the 1995 Pan American Games, held from March 11 to March 26, 1995 in Mar del Plata, Argentina. There were three medal events.

Solo

Duet

Team

Medal table

External links
 Sports 123
 USA Synchro Results

Events at the 1995 Pan American Games
1995
1995 in synchronized swimming